Methodical culturalism is a philosophical approach developed by Peter Janich and his pupils. Its core statement is that science is not developed from purely theoretical considerations, but as a development of everyday, proto-scientific human behavior—in other words, that science is a stylized form of everyday knowledge-forming practice.

Thus, from the viewpoint of methodical culturalism, science is understood as a continuation of the practical processes of the everyday world and must be analyzed from this aspect systematically and methodically.

Methodical culturalism is a development of the methodical constructivism of the Erlangen School of constructivism.

See also 
 Action theory 
 Constructivist epistemology

External links 
Peter Janich: Kulturalismus 
Peter Janich: Kultur des Wissens – natürlich begrenzt? 
Rafael Capurro zum Informationsbegriff von Peter Janich 
Dirk Hartmann: Willensfreiheit und die Autonomie der Kulturwissenschaften (pdf-Datei; 176 KB) 

Philosophy of science